Terminal osseous dysplasia with pigmentary defects is a cutaneous condition characterized by hyperpigmented, atrophic facial macules.

It has been associated with FLNA.

See also 
 Corneodermatosseous syndrome
 Osseous choristoma of the tongue
 List of cutaneous conditions

References

External links 

Genodermatoses